The Ukrainian Second League Cup 2000–01 was the second edition of Second League Cup competition designated exclusively for clubs of the Second League. It was organized as a qualification tournament for the Ukrainian Cup with only the finalist advancing to the national cup competition.

The Cup started with a qualification round on July 29, 2000 and consisted of 12 pairs. The previous year's winner Borysfen Boryspil did not compete, while the finalist Kherson was eliminated in the qualification round by Tytan Armyansk. Unlike the previous year's edition all rounds consisted of a single match. The first round started on August 6. The best four teams qualified for the main event and later continued with this tournament from the semi-final stage. In the Ukrainian Cup the qualified teams Sokil and Polissya managed to make it to the second round, while Mashynobudivnyk was eliminated in the first. Tytan chose not to participate in the main event.

The quarter finals of this competition were played in August 2000, the Cup was resumed only in May of the next year. The final game took place at the CSKA Stadium in Kyiv where Polissya ran over Tytan, figuratively speaking, earning itself the first trophy of the competition. This was the last edition of the Cup. It also was the last season for the second and third teams in cup competitions. Later in 2009-10 a similar tournament was organized for the Second League clubs called The League Cup where junior teams of the First League clubs and amateur clubs were allowed as well.

Competition schedule

Qualification round

First round (of 32)

Second Round (of 16)

Quarterfinals (1/4)

Semifinals (1/2)

Final 

The final was held at the CSKA Stadium on May 9, 2001 in Kyiv.

Top goalscorers

See also 
 Ukrainian Cup 2000-01
 Ukrainian Second League 2000–01

References

External links 
 Calendar of Matches—Schedule of the Ukrainian Cup. 
 

Ukrainian Second League Cup
Ukrainian Second League Cup